Lidia Yuknavitch (born June 18, 1963) is an American writer, teacher and editor based in Oregon. She is the author of the memoir The Chronology of Water, and the novels The Small Backs of Children, Dora: A Headcase, and The Book of Joan. She is also known for her TED talk "The Beauty of Being a Misfit", which has been viewed over 3.2 million times, and her follow-up book The Misfit's Manifesto.

Early life
Yuknavitch was born Lidia Yukman in San Francisco, California. She grew up in a home where her father verbally, physically, and sexually abused her and her sister, and her alcoholic mother did not intervene. As a teen, she was noticed by a "caring and methodical coach," who helped her move towards her dream of becoming a competitive swimmer. The family moved to Florida for additional training, and Yuknavitch began abusing alcohol.

Yuknavitch relocated to Texas after high school, where she attended Austin Community College on a swimming scholarship. While attending college, she worked as a receptionist at the University of Texas at Austin. Yuknavitch had hopes of qualifying for the United States Olympic swimming team, but the boycott of the 1980 Olympic Games in Moscow and her own drug and alcohol abuse ended her competitive swimming career.

Yuknavitch moved to Eugene, Oregon, after she lost her scholarship, where she enrolled in the University of Oregon. There, she was one of the editors of Two Girls Review, which later became 2 Gyrlz Performative Arts. She received her PhD in English literature from the University of Oregon.

Career
In 1987–1988, Yuknavitch, then known as Lidia Yukman, collaborated with a novel-writing class at the University of Oregon taught by Ken Kesey that produced the book Caverns. Although the group of novelists, collectively named "O. U. Levon", are often described as graduate students, Yuknavitch was not actually in graduate school at the time.

Her work has been published in Guernica, Ms., The Iowa Review, Zyzzyva, Another Chicago Magazine, PLAZM, The Sun, Exquisite Corpse, and TANK.

Yuknavitch is associated with fellow Oregon writers Chuck Palahniuk, who wrote the introduction to her novel Dora: A Headcase, Chelsea Cain, who wrote the introduction to The Chronology of Water, Monica Drake, Cheryl Strayed, and Tom Spanbauer. Yuknavitch introduced Spanbauer at the launch for his book I Loved You More at Powell's Books in Portland.

Yuknavitch's 2011 memoir, The Chronology of Water, has developed a cult following, and it was noted in a Huffington Post book review that two years after being published, the book "keeps popping up on blogs and social media feeds". She said she started writing the book as a kind of dare after talking to Chuck Palahniuk about memoir at the end of a meeting of their writers' group. The title comes from a short story Yuknavitch wrote in a writing workshop with Diana Abu-Jaber. The photograph on the book jacket depicts a naked woman in the water. Yuknavitch and her publisher opted to wrap the book in a "belly band" in order to cover the woman's breast. Yuknavitch wrote about this decision in The Rumpus.

Dora: A Headcase, is Yuknavitch's novel about "Dora", the subject of a famous case study by Sigmund Freud. The subject of the study had lost her voice. Yuknavitch wrote that she wanted to "give Dora back her voice and 'talk back' to Freud." In 2014, the book was optioned for a movie by Katherine Brooks.

The Small Backs of Children, published in 2015, was praised by Kirkus Reviews, in which it was called a "brave and affecting novel."

Random House published Yuknavitch's first short story collection, Verge, on February 4, 2020. Yuknavitch read one of the stories, "Street Walker," on the December 10, 2019, episode of the Lit Hub/Podglomerate Storybound podcast, accompanied by original musical composition from the band Whiston & Warmack.

Personal life
Yuknavitch has had relationships with both men and women, including Kathy Acker. She has been married three times. She lives in Portland, Oregon with the filmmaker Andy Mingo and their son, Miles. Mingo and Yuknavitch are the editors of Chiasmus Press, a "micro indie press."

Yuknavitch teaches writing, literature, film, and women's studies and is on the MFA faculty at Eastern Oregon University. She has also taught at Mt. Hood Community College.

Bibliography

Awards
The Small Backs of Children
2016, Ken Kesey Award for Fiction Oregon Book Award
2016, Readers' Choice Oregon Book Award
The Chronology of Water
2012, Readers' Choice Oregon Book Award
2012, Finalist, PEN Center USA Creative Nonfiction Award
2012, Pacific Northwest Booksellers Association Award
2011, Best Books of the Year, The Oregonian
1997, Writers Exchange Award, Poets & Writers

See also
 List of LGBT people from Portland, Oregon

Further reading

References

External links
Corporeal Writing (Yuknavitch's writing workshop website) 
Official website 
TED Talk (video)

1963 births
Living people
Eastern Oregon University faculty
LGBT people from Oregon
Mt. Hood Community College
University of Oregon alumni
Writers from Eugene, Oregon
Writers from Florida
Writers from Portland, Oregon
Writers from San Francisco
Bisexual memoirists
Bisexual academics
American women memoirists
American bisexual writers